Ralph Graham may refer to:
 Ralph Graham (American football)
 Ralph Graham (singer)